Empire: Original Soundtrack from Season 1 is the debut soundtrack album by the cast of the musical drama television series Empire, which airs on Fox. The album includes songs that featured during the first season of the show, and performed by various artists. The album was released by Columbia Records. The soundtrack received positive critical reception and debuted at number one on the Billboard 200 chart in the United States. On September 11, 2015, another soundtrack titled Empire: The Complete Season 1 was released containing every song heard on the show that weren't included on the official soundtrack.

Background
Empire was set to debut on January 7, 2015 on Fox. After finding his lead actors, the show's co-creator Lee Daniels was searching for a talented music producer. Since Daniels considered his music taste "outdated", he asked his children for advice. After being advised by his son and daughter to contact Timothy "Timbaland" Mosley, known for being responsible for many hits in the music industry, Daniels contacted Timbaland. Timbaland eventually agreed to join the Empire family and conducted a team of talented songwriters and music artists. Timbaland described his creative process as being based on "working close with the writers" to help him produce songs that are based on the character that's singing. Eventually, 12 songs were produced for the pilot, alone.

Following the show's success, Columbia Records announced that a soundtrack CD would be released on March 10, 2015.

Promotion
Following the album's release, Jussie Smollett performed "Good Enough" on The Ellen Degeneres Show. Smollett was interviewed by Degeneres and used the opportunity to come out, receiving substantial media attention. Yazz and Smollett also performed "You're So Beautiful" on Good Morning America. During the 2015 Billboard Music Awards, Yazz, Smollett and Estelle performed two songs from the album. The cast embarked on a signing tour throughout the nation, as well.

Critical response

Metacritic gave the album an average score of 61%, indicating "generally favorable reviews" based on five critics. Critics praised Jussie Smollett's performance on the album, describing him as a "break out star". Entertainment Weekly'''s Kyle Anderson praised the CD's variation of genres stating "[the album] is at its best when it eschews goofy gangsta-isms like “Drip Drop” in favor of chest-thumping ballads or stirring hip-hop soul revivals". Further, he applauded Timbaland for "hold[ing] everything together". Pitchfork's Craig Jenkins admired the writer's effort given the fact that they had "to turn Dire Straits’ "Money for Nothing" into swag rap and to feed Courtney Love a gospel choir" stating "there’s nothing they won’t try, and it’s exhilarating". However, he expressed his distaste of the album's "celebrity collaborators" describing them as a "mixed bag".

Justin Charity from Complex Magazine thought the album's rap songs were "goofy as hell" and stated that "not even Mary J. Blige could save the Empire soundtrack". However he admitted that the songs were "catchy" and that the album overall "keeps a few true R&B greats on call for the love of musicality".

Commercial performance
The album was a commercial success. In the United States, it debuted at number one on the Billboard 200, with 130,000 album-equivalent units, surpassing Madonna's thirteenth studio album Rebel Heart'' in a hotly contested week. Although "Rebel Heart" was the best selling album of the week, Empire came ahead in streaming. It sold 110,000 copies in its first week on sale. In January 2016, the album was certified Gold in the United States. The album also debuted at number 26 on the Canadian Albums Chart, with 1,300 copies. As of early 2017, the album has sold nearly 2,000,000 equivalent copies, helped by a Grammy nomination, several TV performances and constant reuse of its songs on the further seasons. Although, the other soundtracks haven't received similar promotion, obtaining lower commercial impact.

Track listing

Charts

Weekly charts

Year-end charts

References

2015 soundtrack albums
Columbia Records soundtracks
Empire (2015 TV series)
Albums produced by Timbaland
Television soundtracks